Āinaloa or Ainaloa is a census-designated place (CDP) in Hawaiʻi County, Hawaiʻi, United States, and is located in the District of Puna. The population was 3,609 at the 2020 census. The population had increased to 2,965 at the 2010 census.

Geography
ʻĀinaloa is located on the eastern side of the island of Hawaiʻi at  (19.525819, -154.994022). It is bordered to the west by Hawaiian Acres, to the north by Orchidlands Estates, and to the northeast by Hawaiian Paradise Park.

Demographics

At the 2010 census there were 2,965 people in 1,005 occupied households residing in the CDP. The racial make-up  was 28.8% White, 0.6% African American, 0.5% Native American & Alaska Native, 14.4% Asian, 14.7% Pacific Islander, 1.2% from other races and 39.8% from two or more races. Hispanic or Latino of any race were 19.0%.

Of the 1,005 households, 38.3% had children under the age of 18 living with them. The average household size was 2.95.

The age distribution was 30.6% under the age of 18, 8.8% from 18 to 24, 16.0% from 25 to 34, 19.3% 35 to 49, 17.2% from 50 to 64 and 8.1% 65 or older. For every 100 females, there were 102.7 males.

In 2000, the median household income was $25,698 and the median family income was $37,647. Males  had a median income of $26,855 and females $26,518. The per capita income was $11,109. About 27.2% of families and 36.6% of the population were below the poverty line, including 46.9% of those under age 18 and 12.2% of those age 65 or over.

References

External links
Ainaloa Community Association

Census-designated places in Hawaii County, Hawaii
Populated places on Hawaii (island)